René Rechtman is a Danish entrepreneur, businessman, and investor. He is the founder and CEO of Moonbug Entertainment and former president of international operations at Maker Studios (now Disney Digital Network).

Education
Rechtman has a master’s degree in Political Science and International Relations from the University of Copenhagen.

Career
In 2000, Rechtman joined Tradedoubler, an internet advertising firm, and established the firm in Denmark. In 2004 he was called to return to the London offices and was named director of advertising. In 2005, Tradedoubler went public and was listed on the Stockholm Stock Exchange.
In 2008, Rechtman became director and co-owner of GoViral, a Danish startup distribution platform for video advertising. He sold the company in 2011 to American AOL for approximately $100 million. He remained on as CEO of AOL BeOn, the global branded content division of AOL Networks, and also served as senior vice president of AOL International.
He served as the president of international operations and was an investor at Maker Studios (which would become Disney Digital Network) in 2014. That same year, the company was acquired by Disney for $500 million and he became head of "non-linear media". In 2016, he co-founded RFRSH Entertainment, a Danish esports entertainment platform, with Nikolaj Nyholm and Jakob Lund Kristensen.

In 2018, Rechtman left Disney and founded Moonbug Entertainment, a children’s entertainment company, with John Robson. The company's most famous series is Cocomelon, with one and a half billion plays on Youtube in one month. He sold the company in November 2021 for $3 billion to two former Disney executives, Kevin Mayer and Tom Staggs, and their Blackstone-backed media company, which was later named Candle Media in January 2022.
He serves on the board of JP/Politikens Hus and Guardian Media Group.
In 2011 and 2012, Rechtman was named in Wired Europes Top 100 most influential list.

Personal life
Rechtman was born in Copenhagen, Denmark. He lives in London with his wife and three children.

References

20th-century births
21st-century Danish businesspeople
21st-century English businesspeople
British mass media owners
Businesspeople from Copenhagen
Danish mass media owners
Internet company founders
Businesspeople in mass media
Moonbug Entertainment
University of Copenhagen alumni
Year of birth missing (living people)
Living people